Guntashveer Amarjeet Singh (born 14 October 1993) is an Indian cricketer from Chandigarh. He is a right-handed batsman and bowls right-arm offbreak.

List-A career
 he represents Haryana in First-class and List-A cricket.

References

External links 
 

1993 births
Indian cricketers
Living people